Steinway Musical Instruments, Inc. is a worldwide musical instrument manufacturing and marketing conglomerate, based in Astoria, New York, the United States.  It was formed in a 1995 merger between the Selmer Industries and Steinway Musical Properties, the parent company of Steinway & Sons piano manufacturers.  From 1996 to 2013, Steinway Musical Instruments was traded at the New York Stock Exchange (NYSE) under the abbreviation LVB, for Ludwig van Beethoven.  It was acquired by the Paulson & Co. private capital firm in 2013.

Through acquisitions and mergers, the company has acquired a large number of musical instrument brand names and manufacturing facilities. Steinway Musical Instruments acquired the flute manufacturer Emerson in 1997, the piano keyboard maker Kluge in 1998, and the Steinway Hall in Manhattan in 1999. In 2000 it acquired the wind instrument manufacturer United Musical Instruments and in 2003 merged it with their subsidiary The Selmer Company to form the Conn-Selmer subsidiary. In 2004 it acquired the wind instrument manufacturer Leblanc and placed it under Conn-Selmer.  It now owns manufacturers of pianos, brasswinds, woodwinds, strings, and percussion.  Brands produced under it include Steinway & Sons pianos, Bach Stradivarius trumpets, C.G. Conn French horns, Leblanc clarinets, King trombones, Ludwig drums, and Selmer saxophones and woodwinds.

The company sells its products through a worldwide network of dealers to professional, amateur and student musicians, as well as orchestras and educational institutions, under dozens of different brand names. It holds exclusive distribution rights for Selmer (Paris) wind instruments and Yanagisawa saxophones in the United States.

It employs a workforce of around 1,700 and operates 11 manufacturing facilities in the United States and Europe, in addition to Asian contract manufacturers.

History
May 1995: Selmer Industries acquired Steinway Musical Properties, parent company of Steinway & Sons piano company. 
July 1996: Selmer Industries was renamed "Steinway Musical Instruments".
August 1996: Steinway Musical Instruments IPO.
January 1997: acquisition of Emerson, flute manufacturer.
December 1998: acquisition of Kluge Klaviaturen, piano key manufacturer.
March 1999: acquisition of Steinway Hall in New York City, prominent piano showroom with concert hall.
November 1999: acquisition of the O.S. Kelly Company, piano plate manufacturer.
January 2000: acquisition of Pianohaus Karl Lang, piano showroom and authorized Steinway piano dealer.
September 2000: acquisition of United Musical Instruments, wind instrument manufacturer.
January 2003: merger of the Selmer Company and United Musical Instruments into one entity under Conn-Selmer.
August 2004: acquisition of G. Leblanc, wind instrument manufacturer and distributor.
May 2008: acquisition of ArkivMusic, online retailer of recorded classical music.
September 2013: acquired by Paulson & Co.

Products

Current products
The company and its subsidiaries produces instruments under the following brand names:

Pianos:
Steinway & Sons – pianos for the top-level market
Boston – pianos for the mid-level market
Essex – pianos for the entry-level market
Brasswinds:
Bach – trumpets, cornets, flugelhorns, trombones
Conn – single and double horns, flugelhorns, cornets, trombones, trumpets, tubas, sousaphones, saxophones
Holton – cornets, French horns, trombones, trumpets
King – marching brass, trombones, baritones, cornets, flugelhorns, French horns, mellophones, trumpets, tubas, sousaphones
Prelude – trumpets, marching brass, piccolos, flutes, clarinets, saxophones (entry-level instruments) (Chinese)
Woodwinds:
Armstrong – flutes, piccolos
Leblanc – clarinets
Selmer – saxophones, clarinets, flutes, oboes, bassoons
Vito – entry-level clarinets
Strings:
Glaesel – violins, violas, cellos, double basses (Chinese)
Scherl & Roth – violins, violas, cellos, double basses (Chinese)
Wm. Lewis & Son – violins, violas, cellos, double basses (Chinese)
Percussion and drums:
Ludwig
Musser
Other:
Listen: Life with Music & Culture – magazines
Rousseau – woodwind mouthpieces
Steinway & Sons Label – record label

Discontinued products
Brasswinds:
Benge – trumpets, piccolo trumpets, trombones
Cleveland
Martin – trumpets, trombones
Woodwinds:
Artley
Avanti – flutes
Emerson – flutes, piccolos
Galway Spirit Flutes – flutes
Noblet
Normandy

References

Steinway & Sons
Musical instrument manufacturing companies of the United States
Music production companies
Musical instrument retailers of the United States
American companies established in 1995
Manufacturing companies established in 1995
2013 mergers and acquisitions